Koha  was a private TV station based in Tirana, Albania. It was owned by the publisher of Koha Jonë newspaper since 1998. In 2003, the station was bought by a group of businessmen who invested in the company to increase the station's production quality. TV Koha was known for its wide range of foreign movies shown every night. Its other popular shows included "Koha Juaj" and "Fokus" with Robert Papa.

Defunct television networks in Albania
Mass media in Tirana
Television channels and stations established in 1998